Mollusks or molluscs are invertebrate animals that make up the phylum Mollusca.

Mollusk may also refer to:

Mollusk, Virginia, a community in Lancaster County
The Mollusk, a 1997 album by rock band Ween

See also